Lichenomima coloradensis is a species of mouse-like barklouse in the family Myopsocidae. It is found in North America.

References

Psocetae
Articles created by Qbugbot
Insects described in 1907